{{DISPLAYTITLE:C19H23NO2}}
The molecular formula C19H23NO2 (molar mass: 297.39 g/mol, exact mass: 297.1729 u) may refer to:

 HDEP-28, or ethylnaphthidate
 Minamestane
 Trepipam